Scytopetalum is a genus of flowering plants belonging to the family Lecythidaceae.

Its native range is Western and Western Central Tropical Africa.

Species:

Scytopetalum kamerunianum 
Scytopetalum klaineanum 
Scytopetalum pierreanum 
Scytopetalum tieghemii

References

Lecythidaceae
Ericales genera